Optimystique is the debut studio album by Greek keyboardist, composer, and producer Yanni, released in 1980 independently. It was re-released in 1984 by Varèse Sarabande and in 1989 by Private Music.

Liner notes

Track listing

Personnel
All music composed and produced by Yanni
Yanni  –  Synthesizers and Keyboards
Ernest LaViolette  –  Drums and Percussion
Tom Sterling  –  Bass guitar on "Twilight"
Dugan McNeill  – Bass guitar on "The Chase"
Tony Matsis  –  Bouzouki on "Strings"
Bruce Kurno  –   Harps

Production
Produced by Jerry Steckling and Yanni
Executive Producers: Mark MacPherson and Tom Paske
Engineered by Jerry Steckling
Assistant Engineer: Chopper Black
Recorded at Cookhouse Studios and Sound 80, Minneapolis, Minnesota
Mastered by Chris Bellman at Bernie Grundman Mastering, Los Angeles

References

External links
Official Website

Yanni albums
1984 albums